Jack Says is a 2008 British thriller film known particularly for being the last professional engagement of Mike Reid, who died shortly after filming in 2007. The film is a contemporary film noir, with comic book undertones that reflect its precursor graphic novel Jack Said, and is comparable in style to Sin City. The film also stars Simon Phillips, Rita Ramnani, Rula Lenska and Eric Cantona.

Synopsis 

Waking up in London with amnesia next to a dead body, Jack has just enough time and sense to disappear before the police arrive. In an attempt to lie low, he heads to Paris to visit the ex he can't remember. But a guy like Jack attracts trouble, and an encounter with the mysterious Girl X draws him and the woman he loves back into a world he's trying hard to avoid ... and to remember.

Cast
Simon Phillips as Jack
Rula Lenska as Garvey
Eric Cantona as Man at Bar
Ashlie Walker as Natalie
Mike Reid as The Guv'nor
Christopher Fosh as Dave
Aurélie Amblard as Girl X
Rita Ramnani as Erin
Danny Idollor as Twinkle
Charlie Palmer as Dr. Matt Poulton
Toby Meredith as a Waiter
 Ashley Cella as nightclub customer

Production
Directed by Bob Phillips, the film was produced by Lucky Strike Productions & Kalimasu Productions. The Director of Photography was Bob Komar. The screenplay was written by Paul Tanter and Film editing was by Paula Baker. The music is created by film composer David Beard with additional music by Lee Miller, Louise Heaney, Mike Watts, Dan Marfisi, Matt Perry and John Harvey.

Release notes
It has been screened at, nominated for, and won awards at numerous UK and international film festivals. The film was released on DVD on 22 September 2008. It has been followed by the sequel films Jack Said and Jack Falls.

Graphic Novel prequel
A prequel story to the film is available as a graphic novel. Titled Jack Said; ; it details the events leading up to the beginning of the Jack Says film. The graphic novel is written by Paul Tanter and illustrated by Oscar Alvarado.

References

External links
 
 David Beard Film Composer

2008 films
British crime films
Films set in England
Film noir
Films set in France
2000s crime films
2000s English-language films
2000s British films